Chakulia may refer to:
Chakulia, a town in Purbi Singhbhum district in the state of Jharkhand, India
Chakulia Airport
Chakulia, Uttar Dinajpur, a village in West Bengal
Chakulia block, a community development block in Jharkhand, India